Lookin' at Monk! is an album by saxophonists Johnny Griffin and Eddie "Lockjaw" Davis featuring compositions associated with Thelonious Monk recorded in 1961 and released on the Jazzland label.

Reception

The AllMusic review by Rick Anderson stated: "this was only the second all-Monk program anyone had recorded and several of these numbers had yet to attain standard status. The playing is uniformly inventive and witty (both required attributes when approaching this repertoire), and Mance is particularly to be commended for maintaining a graceful and elegant attack and not trying to praise Monk by imitation".

Track listing 
All compositions by Thelonious Monk, except as indicated.
 "In Walked Bud" - 4:34    
 "Well, You Needn't" - 5:31    
 "Ruby, My Dear" - 4:39    
 "Rhythm-A-Ning" - 3:53    
 "Epistrophy" (Kenny Clarke, Monk) - 8:36    
 "'Round Midnight" - 5:25    
 "Stickball (I Mean You)" (Coleman Hawkins, Monk) - 5:52

Personnel 
 Eddie "Lockjaw" Davis, Johnny Griffin - tenor saxophone
 Junior Mance - piano
 Larry Gales - bass
 Ben Riley - drums

References 

1961 albums
Eddie "Lockjaw" Davis albums
Johnny Griffin albums
Albums produced by Orrin Keepnews
Jazzland Records (1960) albums
Thelonious Monk tribute albums